Akershus Energi is a Norwegian power company that produces hydroelectricity.

Production
Annual production is 2.3 TWh. There are five plants in Glomma, three in Haldensvassdraget, and two in Skiensvassdraget.

History
The company was founded in 1922. Its first managing director was Augustin Paus. The company is wholly owned by Akershus County Municipality.

In 2011 the Nordic Investment Bank reported: "NIB and the Norwegian energy company Akershus Energi have signed a loan totalling NOK 500 million (EUR 63.3 million) for financing the upgrade of two of Akershus Energi's hydropower plants and the construction of a new district heating plant."

In 2016, Akershus Energi bought half of the Nittedal property after Aller Trykk. In June 2017, the Swedish company Infranode bought one third of Akershus Energi Varme AS.

See also

References 

Electric power companies of Norway
Hydroelectricity in Norway
Akershus County Municipality
County-owned companies of Norway
Companies based in Akershus
Energy companies established in 1922
1922 establishments in Norway